Angel One Limited, formerly known as Angel Broking Limited, is an Indian stockbroker firm established in 1996. The company is a member of the Bombay Stock Exchange, National Stock Exchange of India, National Commodity & Derivatives Exchange Limited and Multi Commodity Exchange of India Limited. It is a depository participant with Central Depository Services Limited (CDSL).

History 
Angel Broking was incorporated on 8 August 1996 as a private limited company. Later, Angel Broking was incorporated as a wealth management, retail and corporate broking firm in september, 1997. In November 1998, Angel Capital and Debt Market Ltd. gained membership of National Stock Exchange as a legal entity. The company opened its commodity broking Division in April, 2004. In November 2007, Birla Sun Life Insurance joined hands with Angel Broking for distribution of its insurance products. The company opened an office in Karol Bagh, New Delhi in October 2012.

In January 2013, a probe found the company and two other entities involved in fraudulent and unfair trade practices in transactions of shares of Sun Infoways during Feb-May 2001. As a result, SEBI restrained from taking new clients for a period of two weeks. Angel filed an appeal against the SEBI order which was dismissed by the Securities appellate tribunal. Angel Broking began offered shares through an initial public offering in September 2020, and was listed on the Bombay Stock Exchange and the National Stock Exchange on 5 October 2020.

The company rebranded as Angel One in 2021.

Offerings
The company offers multiple online trading apps. Services include online stock broking, depository services, commodity trading and investment advisory services, personal loans and insurance, portfolio management services, IPOs business and mutual funds distribution.

References

External links
 

Indian companies established in 1996
1996 establishments in Maharashtra
Financial services companies based in Mumbai
Financial services companies established in 1996
Stockbrokers
Online brokerages
Brokerage firms
Companies listed on the National Stock Exchange of India
Companies listed on the Bombay Stock Exchange
2020 initial public offerings